Epidendrum warszewiczii is a species of orchid.

References

warszewiczii